The thirteenth series of the British medical drama television series Holby City began airing in the United Kingdom on BBC One on 19 October 2010, and ran for 52 episodes, concluding on 11 October 2011.

Episodes

Production
The series is produced by the BBC and airs on BBC One in the United Kingdom. It is 52 episodes long, a reduction on the twelfth series which ran for 55 episodes. On 28 May 2010, the BBC announced that it would be launching a high definition (HD) simulcast of BBC One from the autumn, and that Holby City would move to HD by the end of the year. Prior to its HD broadcast, Holby City was produced using Panasonic P2 Varicam camcorders. Coach House Studios purchased a new Avid Unity Media Network to produce the series in HD, also upgrading the Avid Media Composers and Symphony Nitris systems to the latest software version. The series was simulcast on BBC HD beginning with the opening episode, "Shifts", and on the new BBC One HD channel from its launch in November 2010. Danielle Nagler, head of BBC HD, was pleased with the series' HD debut, which she stated was not flawless, but was a "big improvement" on standard definition.

For series thirteen, Myar Craig-Brown became Holby City series producer, following Diana Kyle, who held the role during the previous series. Craig-Brown had worked on Holby City as a script editor since its fourth series, being promoted to story editor before departing for several years. She then re-applied for a story editor position, and was made acting series producer. The series' consultant producer and lead writer was Justin Young, who was appointed after series creator Tony McHale stood down during series twelve. Young intended to introduce a more writer-led commissioning process, with writers creating more of the theme and story of their episodes than was previously the case. Belinda Campbell initially served as the series' executive producer. In February 2011, it was announced that Holby City founding producer Johnathan Young would return to the BBC from March, succeeding Campbell as executive producer of both Casualty and Holby City.

Cast

Overview 

The series began with 16 roles receiving star billing. Connie Beauchamp (Amanda Mealing) and Elliot Hope (Paul Bradley) are consultants on the cardiothoracic surgery ward, Darwin. Ric Griffin (Hugh Quarshie), Michael Spence (Hari Dhillon) and Jac Naylor (Rosie Marcel) are consultants on the general surgery ward, Keller, while Sacha Levy (Bob Barrett) is a locum general surgery registrar. Joseph Byrne (Luke Roberts) and Greg Douglas (Edward MacLiam) are cardiothoracic registrars, and Oliver Valentine (James Anderson) is a F2 doctor working under Greg. Oliver's sister Penny (Emma Catherwood) is also an F2, and works on the Acute Assessment Unit (AAU), alongside sister Frieda Petrenko (Olga Fedori). Faye Byrne (Patsy Kensit) and Donna Jackson (Jaye Jacobs) are also ward sisters, on Darwin and Keller wards respectively, and Elizabeth Tait(La Charné Jolly) is a staff nurse on Keller. Mark Williams (Robert Powell) is the hospital's Chief Executive Officer. 

Guy Henry was cast as new joint Director of Surgery and consultant general surgeon Henrik Hanssen, who arrived in the series' first episode. His character is "a bit of a mystery man", apparently sent to the hospital by the Department of Health to make budget cuts. Henry describes him as "punctilious, pedantic and passionate about his work" with a dry sense of humour, and a rival to Connie. 

Tina Hobley returned as ward sister Chrissie Williams following four months maternity leave in November 2010, and used her infant son Orson to play Chrissie's son Daniel. Jimmy Akingbola joined the cast in January 2011 as general surgical registrar, Antoine Malick. Laila Rouass was cast as cardiothoracic surgical registrar Sahira Shah, appeared from February 2011. Announcing her casting, Daniel Kilkelly of media entertainment website Digital Spy described Sahira as a rival for Jac and love interest for Greg, who shares a "dark history" with Hanssen. Rouass was able to relate to the role as, like herself, Sahira is a mother attempting to balance her personal and professional lives. Campbell stated that Rouass brought a "fresh new energy" to the series and that Sahira had been a "joy to create", commenting on the character: "While on the surface she appears to be cool and calm, underneath it all, she is kicking madly just to keep afloat. It will be fascinating to explore what is really going on underneath the façade of perfection Sahira has created for herself. I'm sure her character will be someone a lot of viewers will recognise in themselves." Adam Astill was cast as consultant orthopaedic surgeon Dan Hamilton. Former Waterloo Road stars Sarah-Jane Potts and Lauren Drummond joined the cast on 7 June 2011. Potts plays senior staff nurse Eddie McKee and Drummond plays agency nurse Chantelle Lane. 

Recurring characters include Holby NHS trust chairman Terence Cunningham (Roger Barclay), staff nurse Mary-Claire Carter (Niamh McGrady), consultant plastic surgeon Sunil Bhatti (Silas Carson), psychiatric registrar Sarita Dubashi (Rakhee Thakrar), agency nurse Kieran Callaghan (Barry Sloane), who served as a love interest for Donna, and Foundation House Officer 1 (F1) Lulu Hutchison (Fiona Hampton).

Several cast members departed during the course of the series. Kensit resigned from the show during its twelfth series and departed at the end of 2010, having filmed her final scenes on 8 October 2010. She stated that she had had a "fantastic time playing Faye but [...] felt it was the right time to move on." Mealing resigned during 2010 after six years in the role of Connie. Campbell deemed Mealing "an invaluable asset" to the series, commenting: "She created an iconic character and Connie will not be forgotten. Connie will have a dramatic but heart-warming departure which will tie into the dramatic entrance of an exciting new regular character." Roberts also announced his resignation in 2010, after being cast in Pirates of the Caribbean: On Stranger Tides. He filmed his final scenes for Holby City in September 2010. Quarshie took a break from the series when Ric was written out to recuperate from his cancer treatment. Powell also departed from the series to return to working in theatre, explaining: "I've been there for six years, and that was five years longer than I ever anticipated staying, and it just struck me that it was probably time to move on and go back to [my] roots." Jacobs left the show in March 2011, after seven years playing Donna. As the series had seen the departure of so many cast members, and the introduction of many new ones, Jacobs deemed it "a new era with a new cast", one which she was not part of, and stated that the time felt right to leave. Catherwood departed the following month, when her character Penny was killed off.

Main characters 

Jimmy Akingbola as Antoine Malick (from episode 12)
James Anderson as Oliver Valentine
Adam Astill as Dan Hamilton (from episode 18)
Bob Barrett as Sacha Levy
Paul Bradley as Elliot Hope

Hari Dhillon as Michael Spence
Lauren Drummond as Chantelle Lane (from episode 34)
Olga Fedori as Frieda Petrenko
Guy Henry as Henrik Hanssen (from episode 1)
Tina Hobley as Chrissie Williams (from episode 3)

Jaye Jacobs as Donna Jackson (until episode 21)
La Charné Jolly as Elizabeth Tait
Patsy Kensit as Faye Byrne (until episode 11)
Rosie Marcel as Jac Naylor
Edward McLiam as Greg Douglas

Sarah-Jane Potts as Eddi McKee (from episode 34)
Robert Powell as Mark Williams (until episode 15)
Hugh Quarshie as Ric Griffin
Luke Roberts as Joseph Byrne (until episode 13)
Laila Rouass as Sahira Shah (from episode 18)

Recurring and guest characters 
Roger Barclay as Terence Cunningham (until episode 44)
Silas Carson as Sunil Bhatti (episodes 27−52)
Fiona Hampton as Lulu Hutchison (episodes 40−47)
Daisy Keeping as Lleucu Jones (from episode 43)
Niamh McGrady as Mary-Claire Carter
Alan Morrissey as Nicky van Barr (until episode 2)
Barry Sloane as Kieran Callaghan (episodes 5−21)

Reception

Critical response
The series' opening episode received positive reviews from critics. The Daily Mirror Jane Simon commended Henry's debut, writing that he was "off to a head-start, carrying off the haughty, brisk arrogance of a top consultant." What's on TV selected the episode as the "Top TV" choice of the day, similarly commenting that "Henry has a ball playing Holby new top dog, stealing all the best lines as he adds a wonderful slice of cutting humour to proceedings." The Liverpool Daily Post also selected the episode as recommended viewing for the day of broadcast. Another positive review of Hanssen came from Becky Jones of the Leicester Mercury, who deemed him "the best thing about the programme", with all of the best lines. Rebecca Jordan of OntheBox rated the episode 4/5. She enjoyed Henry's "sarcastic yet strangely affable" character, comparing him to Gregory House for his ability to diagnose patients "nearly as fast as he distributes withering one-liners." Jordan pinpointed Hanssen's appeal as being the "much-needed humour" he brought to the series, as well as the dynamic between Hanssen and Connie, writing that "the volatile rapport between him and Connie is thoroughly engaging and leaves little doubt in our minds that he will quickly become an exciting addition to the show." Jordan also enjoyed the "metaphorical genius" of depicting Faye with blood on her hands following her role in Linden's death. The following episode, "The Short Straw", was also selected as the  "Top TV" choice of the day by What's on TV, who commented that "some of the script is a little heavy-handed, but Guy Henry as panto-esque axeman Henrik  is particularly good fun".

Ratings
On 7 December 2010, Holby City was scheduled against the ITV soap operas Emmerdale and Coronation Street, which aired outside their usual timeslots. The episode, "Losing Game", declined by two million viewers on the previous week and attained a 14.6% share of the viewing audience, its lowest percentage since 2003.

References

General

 Titles, credits, airdates and summaries: 
 Airdates and summaries: 
 Viewing figures: 

Specific

External links

Holby City series 13 at the Internet Movie Database

13
2010 British television seasons
2011 British television seasons